All That Matters Is Past is a 2012 Norwegian drama film directed by Sara Johnsen.

Cast
 Maria Bonnevie as Janne
 Kristoffer Joner as William
 David Dencik as Ruud
 Maria Heiskanen as Ragnhild
 Tea Sandanger as Janne 14
 Åsmund Høeg as William 14
 Trond Nilssen as Ruud 18
 Line Billa Ljøstad as Janne 18
 Mads Sjøgård Pettersen as William 18
 Emil Johnsen as Mads

References

External links
 

2012 films
Films directed by Sara Johnsen
2010s Norwegian-language films
2012 drama films
Norwegian drama films